Melaleuca triumphalis is a plant in the myrtle family, Myrtaceae and is endemic to the Victoria River district of the Northern Territory in Australia. It was discovered on a 1996 expedition commemorating the work of the early German-Australian botanist, Ferdinand von Mueller. It is a shrub with grey foliage and contrasting green heads of flowers in spring.

Description

The flowers appear in September and are green, fading to yellow. The stamens are arranged in bundles of five around the flower, with 7 to 12 stamens in each bundle.

Taxonomy and naming
Melaleuca triumphalis was first described in 1998 by Lyndley Craven in Muelleria from a specimen collected in the Judbarra / Gregory National Park on the 1996 expedition to commemorate the centenary of the death of Ferdinand von Mueller. The specific epithet (triumphalis) is a reference to the triumphal results of Mueller on the Gregory expedition and to the collection of a specimen of this species on the centenary expedition.

Distribution and habitat
Melaleuca triumphalis occurs in the Victoria River district in springs at the base of waterfalls and at the top of scree slopes.

Conservation
A search for individuals of this species in the Judbarra / Gregory National Park found 37 populations however it is possible that M. triumphalis also occurs in other places with similar ecological niches such as the Keep River National Park. It has been recommended that the species be classified as "vulnerable".

References

triumphalis
Myrtales of Australia
Flora of the Northern Territory
Plants described in 1998
Taxa named by Lyndley Craven